was a  after Bun'ō and before Bun'ei. This period spanned the years from February 1261 to February 1264.

Change of era
 ; 1261: The new era name was created to mark an event or a number of events. The previous era ended and a new one commenced in Bun'ō 2.

Events of the  Kōchō era
 June 11, 1261 (Kōchō 1, 12th day of the 5th month): Nichiren was exiled to Itō in Izu.
 March 19, 1262 (Kōchō 2, 28th day of the 11th month): Shinran passes away at the age of 90
 April 1, 1263 (Kōchō 3, 22nd day of the 2nd month): Nichiren was pardoned.

Notes

References
 Nichiren. (2004). Writings of Nichiren Shonin: Doctrine 3. onolulu: University of Hawaii Press. 
 Nussbaum, Louis-Frédéric and Käthe Roth. (2005).  Japan encyclopedia. Cambridge: Harvard University Press. ;  OCLC 58053128
 Titsingh, Isaac. (1834). Nihon Odai Ichiran; ou,  Annales des empereurs du Japon.  Paris: Royal Asiatic Society, Oriental Translation Fund of Great Britain and Ireland. OCLC 5850691
 Varley, H. Paul. (1980). A Chronicle of Gods and Sovereigns: Jinnō Shōtōki of Kitabatake Chikafusa. New York: Columbia University Press. ;  OCLC 6042764

External links
 National Diet Library, "The Japanese Calendar" -- historical overview plus illustrative images from library's collection

Japanese eras
1260s in Japan